Ambiant Otaku is the debut studio album by Japanese ambient artist Tetsu Inoue, released on 28th March 1994. The album consists of five long ambient songs. Like many FAX +49-69/450464 releases, it was released not under the artist's name, but under a pseudonym matching the album title.

Track listing

Notes

References 

1994 albums
Tetsu Inoue albums